Zanskar, Zahar (locally) or Zangskar, is a  tehsil of Kargil district, in the Indian union territory of Ladakh. The administrative centre is Padum (former capital of Zanskar). Zanskar, together with the neighboring region of Ladakh, was briefly a  part of the kingdom of Guge in Western Tibet. Zanskar lies 250 km south of Kargil town on NH301.

The Zanskar Range is a mountain range in the union territory of Ladakh that separates the Zanskar valley from Indus valley at Leh. Geologically, the Zanskar Range is part of the Tethys Himalaya, an approximately 100-km-wide synclinorium formed by strongly folded and imbricated, weakly metamorphosed sedimentary series. The average height of the Zanskar Range is about 6,000 m (19,700 ft). Its eastern part is known as Rupshu. Zanskar had a population of approximately 20,000 in 2020. There have been demands to convert Zanskar into a district.

Etymology
Zanskar ( zangs dkar) appears as “Zangskar” mostly in academic studies in social sciences (anthropology, gender studies), reflecting the Ladakhi pronunciation, although the Zanskari pronunciation is Zãhar. Older geographical accounts and maps may use the alternate spelling "Zaskar". An etymological study (Snellgrove and Skorupsky, 1980) of the name reveals that its origin might refer to the natural occurrence of copper in this region, the Tibetan word for which is "Zangs". The second syllable however seems to be more challenging as it has various meanings: "Zangs-dkar" (white copper), "Zangs-mkhar" (copper palace), or "Zangs-skar" (copper star). Others claim it derives from zan = copper + skar = valley. John Crook (1994) partly shares this interpretation but suggests that the origin of this name might also be "Zan-mKhar" (food palace), because the staple food crops are so abundant in an otherwise rather arid region. The locally accepted spelling of the name in Tibetan script is zangs-dkar.

Some of the religious scholars of the district, also cited by Snellgrove and Skorupsky (1980) and Crook (1994), hold that it was originally "bzang-dkar", meaning good (or beautiful) and white. "Good" would refer to the triangular shape of the Padum plain, the triangle being the symbol of Dharma and religion; "white" would refer to the simplicity, goodness, and religious inclinations of the Zanskaris. Thus, even if etymologically it would be more correct to use "Zangskar", the most frequently found spelling for this region is undoubtedly "Zanskar".

History

The first traces of human activity in Zanskar seem to go back as far as the Bronze Age. Petroglyphs attributed to that period suggest that their creators were hunters on the steppes of central Asia, living between Kazakhstan and China. It is suspected that an Indo-European population known as the Mon might then have lived in this region, before mixing with or being replaced by the next settlers, the Dards. Early Buddhism coming from Kashmir spread its influence in Zanskar, possibly as early as 200 BC. The earliest monuments date from the Kushan period. After this eastward propagation of Buddhism, Zanskar and large parts of the Western Himalaya were overrun in the 7th century by the Tibetans, who imposed their then animistic Bön religion.

Buddhism regained its influence over Zanskar in the 8th century when Tibet was also converted to this religion. Between the 10th and 11th centuries, two Royal Houses were founded in Zanskar, and the monasteries of Karsha and Phugtal (see picture) were built. Until the 15th century Zanskar existed as a more or less independent Buddhist Kingdom ruled by two to four related royal families. Since the 15th century, Zanskar has been subordinate to Ladakh, sharing its fortunes and misfortunes. In 1822 a coalition of Kulu, Lahoul, and Kinnaur invaded Zanskar, plundering the country and destroying the royal palace at Padum.

In the mid-20th century, border conflicts between India, Pakistan and China caused Ladakh and Zanskar to be closed to foreigners. During these wars Ladakh lost two thirds of its original territory, losing Baltistan to Pakistan and the Aksai Chin to China. Ladakh and Zanskar, despite a tumultuous history of internal wars and external aggressions, have never lost their cultural and religious heritage since the 8th century.  Thanks to its adherence to the Indian Union, this is also one of the rare regions in the Himalaya where traditional Tibetan culture, society, and buildings survived the Chinese Cultural Revolution. In the last twenty years, the opening of a road and the massive influx of tourists and researchers have brought many changes to the traditional social organisation of Zanskar. In 2007 the valley suffered its third year of a desert locust infestation with many villages losing their crops. The response of the monasteries puja (prayer) to get rid of them, while the government advocated insecticides, which the Buddhists were reluctant to use, but in some cases were forced to try, with as yet undocumented success. In 2008 it was reported that the locusts had left the central Zanskar plains.

People of Zanskar have been demanding their owndistrict, separate from the existing Kargil district, for more than 70 years.

Geography

The Zanskar Range is spread over a vast area from southeastern boundaries of the state of Kashmir and extends in the northwest direction to the eastern limits of Baltistan. It separates Ladakh from the valleys of Kashmir and the Chenab River. In other words, it serves as a boundary line between Ladakh region of Kashmir and the remaining two regions of the state i.e. Jammu region and Vale of Kashmir. This range, in fact is a branch of the great Himalayan range of mountains. Many rivers start in different branches of this range flow northward, and join the great Indus River. These rivers include Hanle River, Khurna River, Zanskar River, Suru River (Indus), and Shingo River. It also separates Kinnaur from Spiti in Himachal Pradesh. The highest peaks of Himachal are in Zanskar range.

Topography
It consists of the country lying along the two main branches of the Zanskar River. The first, the Doda River, has its source near the Penzi La  mountain-pass, and then flows south-eastwards along the main valley leading towards Padum, the capital of Zanskar.

The second branch is formed by two main tributaries known as Kargyag river (also known as Kurgiakh river), with its source near the Shinku La , and Tsarap River, with its source near the Baralacha-La. These two rivers unite below the village of Purney to form the Lungnak river (also known as the Lingti or Tsarap river). The Lungnak river then flows north-westwards along a narrow gorge towards Zanskar's central valley (known locally as jung-khor), where it unites with the Doda river to form the Zanskar river.

The Zanskar river then takes a north-eastern course until it joins the Indus in Ladakh. High mountain ridges lie on both sides of the Doda and Lingti–kargyag valleys, which run north-west to south-east.  To the south-west is the Great Himalayan Range which separates Zanskar from the Kisthwar and Chamba basins. To the north-east lies the Zanskar Range, which separates Zanskar from Ladakh. The only outlet for the whole Zanskar hydrographic system is thus the Zanskar river, which cuts the deep and narrow Zanskar Gorge through the Zanskar range.

The Zanskar range spans  from the Karcha (Suru) River to the upper Karnali River. Kamet Peak  is the highest point in the range.

These topographical features explain why access to Zanskar is difficult from all sides. Communication with the neighbouring Himalayan areas is maintained across mountain passes or along the Zanskar river when frozen. The easiest approach leads from Kargil through the Suru valley and over the Penzi-La. It is along this track that in 1979 the only road in Zanskar was built to connect Padum with the main road from Srinagar into Ladakh. One of the first Tibetologists to spend an extended period in the region was Hungarian scholar Sándor Csoma de Kőrös who spent over a year living in the region in 1823. After being integrated into the newly formed state of India in 1947, Zanskar and the neighbouring region of Ladakh were both declared restricted areas and only opened to foreigners in 1974.

Climate Condition

Zanskar is a high altitude semi-desert lying on the northern flank of the Himalayan Range. This mountain range acts as a barrier protecting Ladakh and Zanskar from most of the monsoon, resulting in a pleasantly warm and dry climate in the summer. Rain and snowfall during this period are scarce, although recent decades have shown a trend towards increasing precipitation. Several water-driven mills were built during ancient periods of drought at a great distance from the villages, but have been abandoned because running water is now available nearer to the settlements. Zanskari houses, though otherwise well built, are not adapted to the recently increasing rainfall, as their roofs leak, catching their surprised inhabitants unprepared. Most of the precipitation occurs as snowfall during the harsh and extremely long winter period. These winter snowfalls are of vital importance, since they feed the glaciers which melt in the summer and provide most of the irrigation water. Parts of Zanskar valley are considered some of the coldest continually inhabited places in the world.

Demography

Zanskar's population is small, the April 2006 medical census records a population of 13,849 people.  The medical census is the most accurate indicator of population as it collects birth, death, and census information from Zangskar's 22 medical aid centers.  Roughly 95% of the inhabitants practice Tibetan Buddhism, while the remainder are Sunni Muslims, whose ancestors settled in Padum and its environs in the 19th century. The majority of Zanskaris are of mixed Tibetan and Indo-European origins; notably Changpa, Dard and Mon. The latter are in fact ethnically Dard, but "Mon" is used in order to distinguish them from later Dard settlers.

The population lives mainly in scattered small villages, the largest being the capital Padum, with nearly 700 inhabitants. Most of the villages are located in the valleys of the Zanskar river and its two main tributaries. Given the isolation of this region, the inhabitants tend towards self-sufficiency, and until recently lived in almost complete autarky. External trade has, however, always been necessary for the acquisition of goods such as tools, jewellery, or religious artefacts.

The Zanskaris' main occupations are cattle-rearing and farming of land that they almost always own. Cultivable land is scarce, and restricted to alluvial fans and terraces, cultivated fields being rarely found above an altitude of 4,000 metres. The Zanskaris have developed a system of intensive arable agriculture and complex irrigation to produce enough food in these conditions. The scarcity of cultivable land has also resulted in a tendency towards a stable, zero-growth population.  An efficient birth-control system in Zanskar has historically been achieved by the common practice of polyandrous marriage, in which several brothers are married to the same wife, and the widespread adoption of a celibate religious life. A high infant mortality rate also contributes to population stability.

In the summer, the women and children stay far away from the villages to tend to the livestock. This system, known as transhumance, is similar to the one found in the Alps where the animals are sent during the summer higher up in the mountains (the alpine meadows) and were kept by the children and women.

Flora and fauna

Much of Zanskar's vegetation is found in the irrigated villages, and on the upper slopes, which receive more precipitation and grow alpine and tundra species. Most impressive are the meadows covered with thousands of edelweiss. At the foot of the Gumburanjon mountain, blue poppies can be found. Crops including barley, lentils, and potatoes are grown by farmers at the lower elevations. Domesticated animals such as the yak, dzo, sheep, horse, and dog are found in the region.

Among the wildlife found in Zanskar are the marmot, bear, wolf, snow leopard, bharal, alpine ibex, gray goral, and lammergeier.

Demographics

Religion

An overwhelming majority of Zanskar is Buddhist. Almost every village has a local monastery, often containing ancient wall-paintings and images. There are two main branches of Tibetan Buddhism here — the Drugpa, including Sani Monastery, Dzongkhul, Stagrimo and Bardan Monastery - all loosely affiliated with Stakna in the Indus valley. The Gelugpa control Rangdum Monastery, Karsha, Stongde and Phugtal Monastery, which all pay allegiance to the Ngari Rinpoche, who has his main seat at Likir Monastery in Ladakh. The present emanation of the Ngari Rinpoche is the younger brother of the Dalai Lama.

Languages

People living in Zanskar speak Zanskari language of the Ladakhi-Balti language group. It is written using the Tibetan script. Monks who have studied outside of Zanskar may know Standard Tibetan. Educated people of Zanskar know English as it is a compulsory subject in Indian schools.

Movies

In 2010, the American film director Frederick Marx made a documentary called "Journey from Zanskar". Narrated by Richard Gere, the film tells the story of two monks helping 17 poor children reaching Tibetan schools in India through a difficult and dangerous travel.

Economy

Livestock

Livestock, and especially the yak, is of paramount importance in Zanskar. Yaks are used to plough the land, thresh grain, and carry heavy loads (up to 200 kilograms). Their dung not only serves as fertiliser but is also the only heating fuel available in the region. They are a vital source of milk and sometimes, but rarely, of meat. Yak fur is used to make clothes, carpets, ropes, and bed covers.

Tourism
Tourism is probably the major disruption that Zanskar has experienced during recent times. The opening of this region to foreigners has brought changes such as the financing of schools and the restoration of monasteries and roads, but has also taken its toll on the fragile mountain environment and its population. 

The first colour film of life in Zanskar was shot in 1958 by an expedition of three British housewives.

See also 
Pensi La
Shingo La

References

Bibliography

External links

 Geology of Zanskar
 Alexander Csoma de Koros Hungarian scholar-traveler to Zanskar

Kargil district
Ladakh
Valleys of Ladakh
Regions of India
Hiking trails in India
Mountain ranges of the Himalayas
Former kingdoms